Education Engineering Department is a Bangladesh government department under the Ministry of Education. It is responsible for implementing government projects of education, the building and maintenance of buildings of public education institutes, and planning and managing development work in the education sector. Dewan Mohammad Hanzala is the chief engineer of the department.

History
Education Engineering Department traces back to an Engineering unit, created in 1972 by President Sheikh Mujibur Rahman,  for the reconstruction, repair, and renovation for the damage done in the Bangladesh Liberation war in 1971. The engineering department was given the Development of Selected Non-Government Secondary Schools project with a budget of 106,490,500,000 taka and is scheduled to complete the project by 2020.

References

1972 establishments in Bangladesh
Organisations based in Dhaka
Government agencies of Bangladesh
Government departments of Bangladesh